Yuriy Pavlovich Agarkov (born 8 January 1987) is a Ukrainian former professional cyclist.

Major results

2008
 1st  Time trial, National Under-23 Road Championships
 5th Overall Le Triptyque des Monts et Châteaux
1st Stage 3
2009
 2nd La Côte Picarde
 4th Memorial Oleg Dyachenko
2010
 1st Stage 4b Tour of Szeklerland
2011
 1st Grand Prix of Donetsk
 9th Overall Five Rings of Moscow
2012
 8th Grand Prix of Donetsk
2013
 3rd Mayor Cup
2014
 9th Central European Tour Košice–Miskolc
 10th Race Horizon Park 1

References

External links

1987 births
Living people
Ukrainian male cyclists
21st-century Ukrainian people